Preslav Crag is a sharp peak rising to approx. 600 m in Friesland Ridge, Tangra Mountains, eastern Livingston Island in the South Shetland Islands, Antarctica.  The peak has precipitous and ice-free south-western and north-eastern slopes and overlooks Prespa Glacier to the southwest and Macy Glacier to the northeast, the latter flowing between Preslav Crag and Peshev Ridge into Brunow Bay.
 
The peak is named after the Bulgarian town of Preslav (Veliki Preslav), that in the ninth century was the capital of the First Bulgarian Kingdom.

Location

Maps
 L.L. Ivanov et al. Antarctica: Livingston Island and Greenwich Island, South Shetland Islands. Scale 1:100000 topographic map. Sofia: Antarctic Place-names Commission of Bulgaria, 2005.
 L.L. Ivanov. Antarctica: Livingston Island and Greenwich, Robert, Snow and Smith Islands. Scale 1:120000 topographic map.  Troyan: Manfred Wörner Foundation, 2009.

References
 Preslav Crag. Composite Antarctic Gazetteer
 Bulgarian Antarctic Gazetteer. Antarctic Place-names Commission. (details in Bulgarian, basic data in English)

External links
 Preslav Crag. Copernix satellite image

Tangra Mountains
Veliki Preslav